This Man Belongs to Me is a 1950 West German comedy film directed by Paul Verhoeven and starring Winnie Markus, Gustav Fröhlich and Heidemarie Hatheyer. It was shot at the Bendestorf Studios outside Hamburg and on location in Hamburg. The film's sets were designed by the art director Erich Grave.

Cast
 Winnie Markus as Gretl Fänger
 Gustav Fröhlich as Dr. Wilhelm Löhnefink
 Heidemarie Hatheyer as Fita Busse
 Gretl Schörg as Rita Andersen
 Wilfried Seyferth as Paul Fänger
 Albert Florath as Dr. Stichnot
 Rudolf Platte as Karl Dewoka
 Hans Schwarz Jr. as Walter Welling
 Gustl Busch as Freifrau von Königsfeld

References

Bibliography 
 Hans-Michael Bock and Tim Bergfelder. The Concise Cinegraph: An Encyclopedia of German Cinema. Berghahn Books, 2009.

External links 
 

1950 films
1950 comedy films
German comedy films
West German films
1950s German-language films
Films directed by Paul Verhoeven (Germany)
German black-and-white films
1950s German films